The West Indies A cricket team is a cricket team representing the West Indies. It is considered the second-tier of West Indies international cricket, below the top-level West Indies cricket team.

When playing one-day cricket, the Windies wear a maroon shirt, with grey around the sides. The shirt also sports the logo of the West Indian Cricket Board and the name of their sponsors, at present, Digicel. The one-day cap is maroon with the WICB logo on the left of the front, with two yellow stripes separated by a green stripe running vertically on the right of the front. When playing first-class cricket, in addition to their cricket whites, West Indian fielders sometimes wear a sunhat, which is maroon and has a wide brim. The WICB logo is on the middle of the front of the hat. Helmets are coloured similarly.

Current squad 

 Table notes

Results

Notes

References

A team
National 'A' cricket teams
C